JDownloader is a download manager, written in Java, which allows automatic download of groups of files from one-click hosting sites. JDownloader supports the use of premium accounts. Some parts of the code are open-source. In December 2009 the program's website was in the top 1000 visited websites of Spain. German online magazine Chip.de designated it "newcomer of the year" in 2009, after it ranked among the top 50 most downloaded applications, with over half a million downloads in a year.

In 2011, JDownloader was superseded by its successor, JDownloader 2. While support for the original JDownloader still exists on forums, the official site only lists JDownloader 2.

Mid-2012 there were complaints that JDownloader's installer added adware without the user's consent. The JDownloader installation contains adware according to several sources, including the developer's own forums. There were further complaints mid-2014. In response a link to the non-adware version was made available but only in a forum post.

In June 2013, JDownloader's ability to download copyrighted and protected RTMPE streams was considered illegal by a German court. This feature was never provided in an official build, but was supported by a few nightly builds.

License

Contrary to the license, some source files are not publicly available. The developers stated that the license may change—the program will remain open source, but will get a license which allows closed-source parts.

Features

Specified features:
 Versions run under (Microsoft Windows, Linux, Mac, etc.), and Java 1.5 or higher
 Can download several files simultaneously, over several connections
 Can automatically solve some CAPTCHAs with its own OCR module (JAntiCaptcha)
 Automatic extractor (including password list search) for RAR archives
 Decrypt RSDF, CCF and DLC Container files
 About 300 decrypt plugins for many services. For example, sj.org, UCMS, WordPress, and RLSLog.
 Supports "hoster plugins" for downloading from e.g. a specific one-click hoster (1230 )
 Can automatically acquire a new IP address to save waiting time with hosts which limit downloads to one address (1400 routers supported)
 Integrated package manager for additional modules (e.g., Web interface, Shutdown)
 Theme support
 Multilingual

The user-specified download links are split into packages to enable individual pausing and continuing of downloads. The program can be configured to unpack split RAR archives automatically after all parts have been downloaded.

JDownloader supports "waiting time" and CAPTCHA recognition on many file hosting sites, enabling batch downloads without user input. Premium users of one-click-host sites can use multiple connections per downloaded file, which increases download speed in most cases. It also supports Metalink, a format for listing multiple mirrors. Software updates and minor patches are released frequently; by default JDownloader updates itself upon initialization.  JDownloader uses a continuous deployment system where modifications to the program code (e.g. adapting a plugin to changes in a download site's HTTP API) can be released within minutes. For the beta version, frequently occurring errors in plugins are detected via automated error reports (leaving out some privacy-sensitive data including the user's IP address and the name of the downloaded file).

See also
 Comparison of YouTube downloaders

References

Further reading
  JDownloader: One-Click-Hoster für jedermann, gulli.com, 29 Aug 2009, (interview with one of the developers)
  JDownloader: un Ares para Rapidshare, El Diario del Centro del País, 12 Feb 2009

External links
 

2008 software
Download managers
Free application software
Free software programmed in Java (programming language)